Pirates Well is a town in the Bahamas, located on Mayaguana island. It has a population of 235 (2012 estimates). Pirates Well is home to a well, clearly marked by a sign and circled by stones and mortar, that was dug by buccaneers in the 16th century, hence the name. The Baycaner Beach Resort is located in Pirates Well.

It is 500 km southeast of the capital Nassau. Pirates Well is 5 meters above sea level.  Average annual temperature in the village is 25  ° C . The warmest month is August, when the average temperature is 28 ° C, and the coldest is January, with 23 ° C. The average annual rainfall is 1,026 millimeters. The rainiest month is October, with an average of 244 mm rainfall, and the driest is March, with 9 mm rainfall.

During Hurricane Irma the sea wall was damaged and several power lines were down in Pirates Well but there was no serious damage to houses.

References

External links
The Pirate's Well

Populated places in the Bahamas